The Newborn Touch is an album by American jazz pianist Phineas Newborn Jr. recorded in 1964 and released on the Contemporary label.

Reception
The Allmusic review by Scott Yanow states "Phineas Newborn's only recording of the 1963-1968 period, the trio outing with bassist Leroy Vinnegar and drummer Frank Butler, finds Newborn's virtuosic style unchanged from the late '50s... Newborn's remarkable control of the piano was still unimpaired".

Track listing
 "A Walkin' Thing" (Benny Carter) – 4:37
 "Double Play" (Russ Freeman) – 3:59
 "The Sermon" (Hampton Hawes) – 2:40
 "Diane" (Art Pepper) – 4:17
 "The Blessing" (Ornette Coleman) – 3:08
 "Grooveyard" (Carl Perkins) – 3:07
 "Blue Daniel" (Frank Rosolino) – 3:18
 "Hard to Find" (Leroy Vinnegar) – 4:04
 "Pazmuerte" (Jimmy Woods) – 3:30
 "Be Deedle Dee Do" (Barney Kessel) – 4:04
 "Good Lil' Man" (Marvin Jenkins) – 3:10 Bonus track on CD reissue
 "Be Deedle Dee Do" [alternate take] (Kessel) – 4:50 Bonus track on CD reissue

Personnel
Phineas Newborn Jr. – piano
Leroy Vinnegar – bass
Frank Butler – drums

References

Contemporary Records albums
Phineas Newborn Jr. albums
1966 albums